The Wembley Cup, also known as The Wembley Cup with EE, was a charity football tournament played at Wembley Stadium in London and held annually between 2015-2018. Before 2018, the tournament was contested by 2 teams who played one standard 90-minute match. In 2018, the tournament was expanded to 4 teams, who played each other in a round-robin group stage of 60-minute matches, not played at Wembley, before 30-minute semi-final and final games played on the same day at Wembley.

Alongside the tournament, a companion video series was uploaded to the Spencer FC YouTube channel which would showcase a number of challenges to determine the squads for the final game. Squads consisted initially of YouTube content creators, with some ex-professionals (referred to in the series as "Legends"). In 2018, the squads were decided before the video series had started, the only exception being which legend was draft picked to play for each team. The order of this draft pick was based on the final standings of the aforementioned group stage.

All matches were also uploaded to the Spencer FC YouTube channel, with matches at Wembley from 2016 onwards being livestreamed as well as being watched by a crowd in the stadium.

The tournament was sponsored each year by mobile phone network EE, who also sponsor Wembley Stadium.

History 

In August 2015, the EE Wembley Cup kicked off for the first time and it saw Spencer FC take on Sidemen United. This Wembley Cup was played behind closed doors and had no attendees. The two captains were Spencer Owen (Spencer FC) and Miniminter (Sidemen United). This was also the only Wembley Cup not to include 'legend' players in the teams and not to be live streamed on YouTube. The final ended in Spencer FC beating Sidemen FC by five goals to two.

With the 2015 Wembley Cup being a hit with fans, a second season was confirmed, but this time Spencer FC faced Weller Wanderers. The two captains for the second series were Spencer Owen (Spencer FC) and Joe Weller (Weller Wanderers) The whole match was completely revamped with the introduction of the match being live streamed on YouTube, the sale of live tickets to the game, the inclusion of some former professional footballers, namely Peter Schmeichel, Robbie Fowler, Robert Pires, Jay-Jay Okocha, Patrick Kluivert and Jamie Carragher. Over 18,000 people attended live and hundreds of thousands watched the livestream on YouTube. This bought the Wembley Cup to the attention of the media and other news outlets. 

The 2017 event saw two different and new teams enter the mix. Hashtag United (captained by Spencer Owen) came up against Tekkers Town (captained by the F2 Freestylers). Spencer and his side had to be on their best form to beat the 'strongest' YouTube footballing team out there. The third series saw five new Footballing 'Legends' entering the mix. Robbie Fowler was the only 'Legend' from Series Two to be in Series Three. He was joined by David James, Robbie Savage, Steven Gerrard, Emile Heskey and William Gallas. Rio Ferdinand was set to play in the Wembley Cup 2017 Final but unfortunately sustained an injury which ruled him out. The Frenchman, William Gallas had big boots to fill. Much like the second Wembley Cup, it was live streamed on YouTube, tickets available for purchase and 'legends' making an appearance. The third season of the Wembley Cup was a landmark for YouTube football as it doubled the YouTube football attendance record set by the previous Wembley Cup from 18,00 to 34,172. It was also the first time the FA trialled VAR at Wembley, although it was not called upon within the game. Spencer Owen's Hashtag United came out on top when they comfortably beat Tekkers Town 6-1. 

The 2018 series consisted of four teams battling it out in a Group Stage format. These teams were Hashtag United, F2 FC, XO FC and Rebel FC. Hashtag United come out on top of the group with F2 FC coming 2nd, XO FC coming third and Rebel FC finishing fourth. Hashtag United faced Rebel FC in the first Semi Final and XO FC came up against F2 FC in the second Semi Final. Rebel FC shocked the YouTube Football scene when they came out victorious against the holders Hashtag United. The game ended 0-1. For this series, EE introduced new rules, including a fast and furious 30-minute match format, Man Down Time and Sin Bins, turning the traditional footballing tournament on its head. The live semi-final, which saw F2 FC & XO FC go head to head, was the first game in The EE Wembley Cup Final history to see Man Down time brought into play. A new rule which saw a player from each team leave the field every minute until a team scores. The second semi final between F2 FC & XO FC ended in a 0-0 draw and had to be decided in the 'dreaded' Man Down stage. Bradley Simmonds stole the match for F2 FC as the players were quickly dropping off the field. This set up a final between Rebel FC and F2 FC. The French Footballing 'Legend', David Trezeguet opened the scoring after a looping volley which forced Rebel FC Goalkeeper, Kaelin Martin make an unfortunate mistake which ultimately led to F2 FC grabbing their first ever Wembley Cup trophy.

Wembley Cup 2015 
The 2015 Wembley Cup was the inaugural edition of the Wembley Cup, an annual football competition contested by two teams. It took place at Wembley Stadium in London, England.

Spencer FC beat Sidemen United 5-2 in the final to win the competition and their first title.

Wembley Cup 2016 
The 2016 Wembley Cup was contested by two teams. It took place at Wembley Stadium.

Spencer FC beat Weller Wanderers 7-4 in the final to win the competition and their second title.

Wembley Cup 2017 
The 2017 Wembley Cup was contested by two teams. It took place at Wembley Stadium.
Rio Ferdinand was supposed to play for Hashtag United, but did not due to injury, so William Gallas took his place for the game.

Hashtag United beat Tekkers Town 6-1 in the final to win the competition and their third title.

Wembley Cup 2018 
The 2018 Wembley Cup was the fourth edition of the Wembley Cup. The 2018 competition was the first to be contested by four teams, in a four way tournament style. It was also the first to introduce Man Down or Golden Goal, which is where a player was removed for every minute without a goal. Eventually only the goalkeepers remained, and a goal ends the extra time period. 

The first two games played were Hashtag United VS Rebel FC Followed by F2 FC VS XO FC. The winners of each game played each other in the final. As a result of the first two fixtures, the final was Rebel FC vs F2 FC. All three matches were played at Wembley Stadium, London.

There were four legends and four YouTubers, whose teams were decided in a draft style format. Draft picks were as follows:
 Hashtag United: ChrisMD (YouTuber), Robert Pires (Legend)
 XO FC: Séan Garnier (YouTuber), Cafu (Legend)
 F2 FC: Manny (YouTuber), David Trezeguet (Legend)
 Rebel FC: Joe Weller (YouTuber), Michael Essien (Legend)

Group stage

Group stage - Round One

Group stage - Round Two

Group stage - Round Three

Semi-finals

Final

Wembley Cup Finals goalscorers

Wembley Cup Man of the Match winners 
No player was awarded Man Of The Match in 2015

Players who have played in multiple tournaments

Records and statistics 
Team
Most wins: 2:
Spencer FC: 2015, 2016
Most consecutive wins: 2:
Spencer FC: 2015, 2016
Most goals in a final: 11:
Spencer FC 7–4 Weller Wanderers

Individual
Most wins by player: 3, Spencer Owen (Hashtag United)
Most wins by manager: 3, Martin Keown, 2015, 2016, 2017
Youngest Wembley Cup player: Scott Pollock (Hashtag United), 16 years
Most goals in a single final: RossiHD, Daniel Cutting, Patrick Kluivert, Theo Baker (twice): 2
Most final goals: Theo Baker: 4

References

External links
 

2016–17 in English football
2017–18 in English football
English football friendly trophies
Events at Wembley Stadium
Recurring sporting events established in 2015
Football cup competitions in England